Ferenc Csanádi (26 March 1925 – 7 September 1985) was a Hungarian football manager who managed Ferencváros. Besides Hungary, he managed in Guinea and DR Congo.

Career
In 1967, Csanádi was appointed as manager of DR Congo. He helped them win the 1968 African Cup of Nations.

References

Hungarian football managers
Hungarian expatriate football managers
Hungarian footballers
Expatriate football managers in Guinea
Hungarian expatriate sportspeople in Guinea
Expatriate football managers in the Democratic Republic of the Congo
Hungarian expatriate sportspeople in the Democratic Republic of the Congo
1925 births
1985 deaths
Footballers from Budapest
Ferencvárosi TC managers
Guinea national football team managers
Democratic Republic of the Congo national football team managers
1968 African Cup of Nations managers
Association footballers not categorized by position